Junie Massiah Anthony (born 29 November 1968) is a former West Indian cricketer. Anthony was a right-handed batsman.

In February 2006, Anthony played for the United States Virgin Islands in the 2006 Stanford 20/20, whose matches held official Twenty20 status. He made two appearances in the tournament, in a preliminary round victory against St Maarten and in a first-round defeat against St Vincent and the Grenadines. He later played for the United States Virgin Islands in their second appearance in the Stanford 20/20 in 2008, making two appearances in a preliminary round victory against St Kitts and in a first-round defeat against Antigua and Barbuda. In his four Twenty20 matches, he scored a total of 72 runs at an average of 36.00 and a high score of 32 not out.

References

External links
Junie Anthony at ESPNcricinfo
Junie Anthony at CricketArchive

1968 births
Living people
United States Virgin Islands cricketers
Place of birth missing (living people)